The Wamma River (Wami River) is a river in northern part of Western Papua, Papua province, Indonesia.

Geography
The river flows in the northern area of Papua with predominantly tropical rainforest climate (designated as Af in the Köppen-Geiger climate classification). The annual average temperature in the area is 22 °C. The warmest month is June, when the average temperature is around 23 °C, and the coldest is February, at 22 °C. The average annual rainfall is 5380 mm. The wettest month is March, with an average of 583 mm rainfall, and the driest is October, with 256 mm rainfall.

See also
List of rivers of Indonesia
List of rivers of Western New Guinea

References

Rivers of Central Papua
Rivers of Indonesia